Paul B. Schabas is a judge of the Ontario Superior Court of Justice.

Prior to his appointment to the bench, he was senior litigation partner at Blake, Cassels & Graydon LLP in Toronto and was one of Canada's leading barristers.  In addition to a busy commercial litigation practice, Paul acted for clients on arbitrations, white collar criminal and regulatory matters, constitutional, media and public law cases.  For thirty years he represented Canada’s major media organizations on defamation, copyright, access to information and free expression matters.  Paul was counsel on leading Charter and human rights cases, many before the Supreme Court of Canada. Paul is a Fellow of the American College of Trial Lawyers, and the International Academy of Trial Lawyers.

In June 2018, Paul completed two years as the 66th Treasurer (President) of the Law Society of Ontario, the regulator of the province’s 50,000 lawyers and 8,000 licensed paralegals.  Paul was only the second lawyer from Blakes to hold this distinguished position, the first being Edward Blake, the firm's founding partner, who was Treasurer from 1879 to 1893.   Prior to being elected Treasurer, Paul was a bencher of the Law Society, elected in 2007 and re-elected in 2011 and 2015. As a bencher, he served as chair of the Professional Regulation Committee, the Proceedings Authorization Committee, the Human Rights Monitoring Group, and the Access to Justice Committee. He was a member of the Equity and Indigenous Affairs, Tribunals and Finance Committees, and the Articling and Mentoring Task Forces.  He also chaired numerous panels of the Law Society Tribunal, adjudicating professional conduct and licensing issues.

An adjunct professor at the University of Toronto Faculty of Law, Schabas teaches a popular course on media law with Bert Bruser, a Blakes partner emeritus and counsel to the Toronto Star.  
Schabas also served as Vice-Chair on the University Tribunal adjudicating academic offences.  He previously taught trial practice at York University's Osgoode Hall Law School, and lectured at Trinity College, University of Toronto, where he taught an introductory course on law to undergraduates. He frequently speaks on a variety of legal matters at professional and academic gatherings in Canada, the United States and abroad. Schabas has published numerous articles, from scholarly peer-reviewed work to op-eds in major daily newspapers. His articles have been cited by the Supreme Court of Canada on several occasions.

Paul is a past Trustee and Chair of the Law Foundation of Ontario,  and a former Chair of Pro Bono Law Ontario, of which he was a founding director.  He is a Past President of the Canadian Media Lawyers Association and a current Director of the Canadian Civil Liberties Association, The Osgoode Society for Canadian Legal History, the Canadian Journalism Foundation, and Lawyers Rights Watch Canada.  He is a former Director of the Advocates' Society, Family Service Toronto and the National Youth Orchestra of Canada.

Education
Schabas was called to the Bar of Ontario in 1986.  He received an LLB  from the Faculty of Law at the University of Toronto in 1984. Prior to law school, in 1981 he completed an Honours BA (With Distinction) in History at University College, University of Toronto. From 1976 to 1978 Schabas attended the School of Music at Indiana University (Bloomington) where he studied French Horn with Philip Farkas as a student in the B. Mus. Performance program.   under

Career
Schabas began his legal career as an articling student and Associate lawyer under Morris Manning QC in Toronto in 1984.  His first major trial was as Mr Manning's student in Regina v. Morgentaler, Smoling and Scott, in which a jury refused to convict three physicians for operating an abortion clinic in downtown Toronto in violation of Canada's Criminal Code. As a student, and subsequently as Manning's Associate following his Call to the Bar, Schabas was co-counsel on the landmark decision of the Supreme Court in the same case which struck down Canada's abortion law under the Canadian Charter of Rights and Freedoms in January 1988.  While with Manning, from 1984 to 1988, Schabas practiced criminal defense, administrative and constitutional law.

In 1988, Schabas joined Blakes as an Associate in its Litigation Department.  Over the next several years Schabas developed skills in civil litigation, municipal and environmental, estates, tax, human rights and media law, while continuing to practice in the areas of criminal and constitutional law.  He worked with several eminent senior counsel including Jake Howard QC, John Brown QC, Jim McCallum QC, Russell Juriansz, Kathryn Feldman, Bert Bruser and Brian Rogers.  Schabas became a partner at Blakes in 1992. Since that time Schabas has handled hundreds of cases, appearing as counsel before administrative tribunals and on trials, judicial reviews, applications and appeal in courts in Ontario, Manitoba, Newfoundland, and New Brunswick, as well as the Federal Courts, the Tax Court and the Supreme Court of Canada.  Schabas has appeared in the Supreme Court on 21 occasions.  Prior to his appointment to the bench, he had been counsel on several domestic and international commercial arbitrations in Canada and the United States.

In April 2019, Schabas was appointed as a Judge of the Ontario Superior Court of Justice.

References

Treasurers of the Law Society of Upper Canada
Living people
Year of birth missing (living people)
Ontario courts
Judges in Ontario